Intermediate 1 is an educational qualification in Scotland on the Scottish Qualifications Authority (SQA) Scottish Qualifications Certificate (SQC) achievement ladder similar to General Level at Standard Grades; it is the next step after Access 3.  It is delivered by the majority of Scottish secondary schools as part of the Higher Still reforms instituted in 2000 by the SQA and the Scottish Executive.

Intermediate 1 is Level 4 on the Scottish Credit and Qualifications Framework.

Though equivalent to the General Level Standard Grade it is considered slightly more difficult, with mandatory passes needed in the National Assessment Bank internal assessments.

It has been available to pupils (generally in S5) who achieved a grade 5,6 or sometimes a 7 at Standard grade, but with more schools choosing to use Intermediates over Standard Grade, is now more commonly available to S3/S4 pupils. It is believed that Intermediates are more useful to the students than Standard grades- the work was more demanding, and prepared the pupils for Higher better, with a similar format to the reformed higher exams.

As with other exams in the Higher Still curriculum, the grades pupils can receive in the final exam are A (usually about 70%+), B (usually about 60%+), a C (usually about 50%+), a D (usually 45–49%) or an F also known as a No Award (usually under 45%).

The next education level is Intermediate 2.

Educational qualifications in Scotland
Secondary school qualifications
School examinations
Secondary education in Scotland